Roscommon Abbey is a former Augustinian/Dominican Priory and National Monument located in Roscommon, Ireland.

History

Roscommon Abbey is an early monastic site, founded in the 6th century by St Comman, a disciple of Finnian of Clonard.

Roscommon Abbey was a monastery of the Augustinian Canons Regular — Arroasian founded after 1140, possibly with Arroasian reformation 1140-8 by Tairrdelbach Ua Conchobair at the instance of Saint Malachy.

Roscommon Abbey was plundered by William de Burgh in 1204 and burned by the Anglo-Normans in 1235 and 1247.

Roscommon Abbey was a Dominican priory founded in 1253 by Fedlim Ó Conchobair, king of Connacht. It was plundered by Mac William de Burgo 1260. It was hit by fire in 1270 and lightning in 1308.

Roscommon Abbey was dissolved before 1578; granted to Sir Nicholas Malby in 1578 and to Francis Annesley, 1st Viscount Valentia in 1615.

Building

Roscommon Friary is located in the southern part of Roscommon town, The church consisted of a single long aisle with nave and choir; the northern transept was added in the fifteenth century.

On his death in 1265 Fedlim Ó Conchobair was interred in the abbey and his tomb was covered by an effigial slab which can still be seen in a niche in the north-east corner of the church. The effigy was carved between 1290 and 1300 and is one of only two Irish royal effigies surviving from this period.

Gallery

References

Augustinian monasteries in the Republic of Ireland
Dominican monasteries in the Republic of Ireland
Archaeological sites in County Roscommon
National Monuments in County Roscommon
Roman Catholic churches in County Roscommon